Qur'an Gate or Shiraz Gate is a historic gate in the north of Shiraz, Iran. It is located at the northeastern entrance of the city, on the way to Marvdasht and Isfahan, between Baba Kouhi and Chehel Maqam Mountains near Allahu Akbar gorge.

History
The Gate was first built during the reign of 'Adud ad-Dawla. By the time of the Zand dynasty, it had sustained a lot of damage, so it was restored and a small room on top was added, in which were kept hand-written Qur’āns by Sultan Ibrahim Bin Shahrukh Gurekani. The two Qur’āns are known as Hifdah-Man. Travelers passing underneath the gates were believed to receive the blessing of the Holy Book as they began their trip or journey from Shiraz.

During the Qajar dynasty, the gate was damaged by multiple earthquakes; it was later restored by Mohammad Zaki Khan Nouri. In 1937 the two Qur’āns were taken from the gate and were taken to the Pars Museum in Shiraz, where they remain today. In 1949 the arch of the gate was restored by Hosein Igar, a merchant also known as E'temad Al-Tojar. 

Today the gates are part of a city park where Shirazis relax and picnic during their leisure hours.

References

External links
Panoramic Photography from 2015 of Qur'an Gate
Shirazcity.org: Pictures of the Qur'an Gate

Architecture in Iran
Buildings and structures completed in the 10th century
Buildings and structures in Shiraz
City gates
Tourist attractions in Shiraz